Jon Ford, (born 24 July 1985) better known by his stage name Joyryde (stylised as JOYRYDE), is an English DJ and producer, son of John Ford (also known as John Phantasm and owner of Phantasm Records).

Early career
Inspired by his father John Phantasm (and consequently the music he heard playing at home when he was young), Ford started producing his own music in the studio from the age of 9 but did not begin DJing worldwide until he was 13. Wrapped up in the life of DJing, Ford did not return to the studio until he was 15, which was when he 'wanted to get back into the producing part of it since the music was getting more technical'. Not until then did he start producing under the name of Eskimo. The name was chosen because it bears no connection 'to the product'. At age 17 he released his first album Can You Pick Me Up.

Eskimo's music began to show up in the sets of psytrance DJs across the globe. By the time he performed his first live set, his repertoire had trebled. His many remixes from this time - some still unreleased due to copyright wrangles - included Infected Mushroom and Skazi, but it was his unofficial remix of The Prodigy "Voodoo People" that was most popular.

In summer 2004, Eskimo released his second artist album "Take A Look Out There" which included the well-known "Party Pooper", a track sampling the police shutting down a free party. November 2005 saw the release of Balloonatic Part One. Balloonatic Part Two followed in September 2006.

From 2011 to 2015, Ford was a member of electronic music duo Lets Be Friends, which released singles such as "Manslaughter" and "FTW". The duo has been inactive since his transition to performing as Joyryde.

Joyryde
Since 2015, Ford has produced bass-heavy house music, solo, under the name Joyryde. He has released all free downloads so far, such as "Flo" and "Speed Trap".

In 2016, Joyryde signed onto Owsla, releasing singles "Hot Drum" and "Damn" on the record label in 2016 and releasing "I Ware House" and "New Breed" on the label in 2017. He shifted labels to Hard Records in 2019 and released his debut LP, Brave, in 2020.

Discography

Studio albums as Eskimo
 2003: Can you Pick Me Up? (Phantasm Records)
 2004: Take a Look Out There (Phantasm Records, Arcadia Music)
 2005: Balloonatic Part One (Phantasm Records)
 2006: Balloonatic Part Two (Phantasm Records)
 2010: Cheap Thrills (Phantasm Records)

Collaborations as Eskimo
 2005: Dynamo - Acid Daze (Eskimo vs Dynamic, Phantasm Records)
 2007: Void - Music With More Muscle (Chemical Crew)
 2010: Balloonatic Part Three
 2010: The Megaband - Propaganda (April 2010)

Extended plays with Lets Be Friends
 2013: Lets Be Friends
 2013: IOA

Singles with Lets Be Friends
 2013: "Manslaughter" (VIP Mix)
 2014: "FTW"

Studio albums as Joyryde
 3 April 2020: Brave (HARD Records)

Charted singles

Singles as Joyryde
 22 March 2015: "Kickin Off"
 13 April 2015: "Hoodlum"
 23 April 2015: "Mercy" (featuring Candi Staton)
 11 May 2015: "Flo"
 13 July 2015: "Speed Trap"
 29 September 2015: "Give My Love"
 20 October 2015: "Hari Kari"
 8 December 2015: "Hoam"
 12 January 2016: "Windows" (featuring Rick Ross)
 15 February 2016: "Fuel Tank"
 16 May 2016: "The Box"
 20 July 2016: "Maximum King"
 16 November 2016: "Hot Drum" (OWSLA)
 5 December 2016: "Damn" (featuring Freddie Gibbs) (OWSLA)
 21 February 2017: "I Ware House" (OWSLA)
 5 May 2017: "New Breed" (featuring Darnell Williams) (OWSLA) []
 22 February 2019: "I'm Gone" (Hard Records)
 22 March 2019: "Yuck" (featuring Gold) (Hard Records)
 23 August 2019: "Madden" (Hard Records)
 4 October 2019: "Selecta 19" (Hard Records)

Remixes as Joyryde
 15 September 2015: Jauz - "Feel The Volume" (Joyryde 'Stick It In Reverse' Mix)
 25 March 2016: Destructo - "4 Real" (Joyryde 'Swurve' Mix)

References

External links
 Joyryde official website

Living people
1985 births
English house musicians
English record producers
English DJs
Electronic dance music DJs
Owsla artists